The following highways are numbered 417:

Canada
 Manitoba Provincial Road 417
 Newfoundland and Labrador Route 417
 Ontario Highway 417

Costa Rica
 National Route 417

Iceland
 Route 417

Japan
 Japan National Route 417

United States
  Florida State Road 417
  Georgia State Route 417 (unsigned designation for Interstate 575)
  Maryland Route 417 (former)
  North Carolina Highway 417 (future)
 New York:
  New York State Route 417
 New York State Route 417 (former)
  Pennsylvania Route 417
  Puerto Rico Highway 417
  South Carolina Highway 417
  Tennessee State Route 417